The 2001 Women's European Water Polo Championship was the ninth edition of the bi-annual event, organised by the Europe's governing body in aquatics, the Ligue Européenne de Natation. The event took place in Budapest, Hungary from June 16 to June 23, 2001.

Teams

Group A

 
 
 

Group B

Preliminary round

Group A

June 16, 2001 

June 17, 2001 

June 18, 2001

Group B

June 16, 2001 

June 17, 2001 

June 18, 2001

Quarterfinals
June 19, 2001

Semifinals
June 21, 2001

Finals
June 19, 2001 — Seventh place

June 21, 2001 — Fifth place

June 23, 2001 — Bronze Medal

June 23, 2001 — Gold Medal

Final ranking

Individual awards
Most Valuable Player

Best Goalkeeper

Best Scorer
 — 14 goals

References
  Results

Women
2001
International water polo competitions hosted by Hungary
Women's water polo in Hungary
European Championship
Water polo
June 2001 sports events in Europe
International sports competitions in Budapest
2000s in Budapest